Balboa Terrace is a small residential neighborhood in southwestern San Francisco. It is bounded by Junipero Serra Boulevard, Monterey Avenue, Aptos Avenue and Ocean Avenue along the southern edge of the exclusive St. Francis Wood development.

References

Neighborhoods in San Francisco